Chahar Suq (also Romanized as Chahār Sūq) is a village in Dughayi Rural District, in the Central District of Quchan County, Razavi Khorasan Province, Iran. At the 2006 census, its population was 16, in 7 families.

References 

Populated places in Quchan County